Ko Jae-wook is a former Korean footballer and football manager.

He was a member of  Korean national football team for five years in the 1970s. He played in the 1974 FIFA World Cup qualifying match against Australia, scoring the equalizing goal. A training injury to his knee ended his playing career. 

His first managerial post was at his alma mater, Joongdong High School.  Under his management, the  Joongdong team flourished and won many honours. Ko Jae-wook joined Lucky-Goldstar Hwangso as coach in 1984, and was appointed manager in 1989. Ko achieved immediate success with Lucky-Goldstar Hwangso by winning the 1990 K-League title. He was appointed manager of Ulsan Hyundai Horangi in December 1994. In his second season (1996), Ulsan Hyundai Horang-i won the K-League title.

International Tournament 
 1972 Mereudekakeop years
 1974 FIFA World Cup Asian qualifying round
 1974 The 7th Asian Games in

Honours

Manager
Lucky-Goldstar Hwangso
K-League : 1990
Ulsan Hyundai Horangi
K-League : 1996

See also
Football (soccer)

References 

 Besteleven 1990.12
 Besteleven 1995.01

External links 
 

South Korean footballers
1972 AFC Asian Cup players
South Korean football managers
FC Seoul managers
K League 1 managers
FC Seoul non-playing staff
Ulsan Hyundai FC managers
Living people
1951 births
Association football midfielders
Footballers at the 1974 Asian Games
Asian Games competitors for South Korea
Sportspeople from South Gyeongsang Province